Michael McNay is a British journalist and author. He worked for 37 years at The Guardian, where he was arts editor.

References

External links
 The Guardian archive
 Muckrack

British journalists
Living people
The Guardian journalists
Year of birth missing (living people)